Tripping Daisy Live – Get It On (also known as just Get It On) is the first extended play and only live album by American rock band Tripping Daisy. It was released on June 6, 1994, through the Island Red Label. It was intended to be a stop-gap release between the re-release of Bill (1993) and the band's next studio album, I Am an Elastic Firecracker (1995), and to help build up the band's fanbase.

Composition 
Get It On was recoded in the summer of 1993 at Trees Dallas. The first two songs on Get It On are derived from the band's debut album Bill, whilst "It's Safe, It's Social" and the title track are new, original songs. The album's final song is a cover of Bad Religion's "We're Only Gonna Die". Get It On was described as featuring a "harder rocking" sound in contrast to that of Bill.

Reception 

Get It On received mixed reviews from critics. Allmusic awarded the EP two stars out of five. Trouser Press criticized the EP's title track as "a maddening novelty number in which [Tim] DeLaughter blurts the title over and over with barely a pause for breath." Alternatively, Cashbox's Troy J. Augusto praised the EP as "fun filler", and believed that the release "shows further growth from this promising pop-punk quartet".

Tripping Daisy were unhappy with Island's decision to release Get It On, citing its poor quality; Tim DeLaughter commented in 1998 that the band's performance at Trees "wasn't the best show to do [a live album] on". By September 1995, Get It On had sold 4,000 copies in the United States, according to Nielsen SoundScan.

Track listing

Personnel 
Personnel per liner notes.Tripping Daisy
 Tim DeLaughter – vocals
 Bryan Wakeland – drums 
 Wes Berggren – guitar 
 Mark Pirro – bass
Production
 James McWilliams – live sound engineer
 Kirby Orrick – mixing (at Time Capsule Recording Studio)
 Greg Calbi – mastering
 Scott Berman  – lighting technician
Management
 James Dowdall – A&R 
 Rose Noone – A&R 
 Eric Ferris – management (for Three Angles Management)
 Lance Miller – production manager
 Stephen Agnew – road manager
Artwork and photography
 Tripping Daisy  – art direction 
 Deborah Melian –  art design 
 Alex Halpern (2) – photography
 Alex Rappoport  – photography
 Erich Schlegel  – photography
 James Bland  – photography
 Jared Miller – photography

Release history

References 

1994 EPs
Live EPs
Island Records EPs
Tripping Daisy albums